Plage i Laśkiewicz (Plage & Laśkiewicz) was the first Polish aerospace manufacturer, located in Lublin and manufacturing aircraft under Lublin name. Full name was: Zakłady Mechaniczne E. Plage i T. Laśkiewicz – Mechanical Works E. Plage & T. Laśkiewicz. The factory produced aircraft between 1920 and 1935, when it was nationalized as the LWS.

History

Beginnings and license production 
The company was founded in 1860 as Fabrykę Wyrobów Miedziowych, a mechanical workshop specializing in the manufacture of copper products. However, by 1919 it had been renamed Plage i Laśkiewicz and that year it started producing aircraft. On February 17, 1920, the Polish government ordered a licence production of Italian fighters Ansaldo A.1 Balilla and light bombers Ansaldo A.300 in Plage & Laśkiewicz. The first Polish A.300 was flown on June 14, 1921. However, due to lack of experience, a quality of produced aircraft was low, and there were numerous crashes. As a result, the order was limited to 70 A.300 and 50 A.1 only, produced by 1924.

Despite its unsuccessful beginning the factory gained experience, and there were no major problems with future aircraft series. In 1924, the Polish government ordered a licence production of French light bombers Potez XV, and in 1925–1926, there were built 100 of them in Plage & Laśkiewicz. In 1928–1931 the works produced 150 of more modern Potez 25. In 1929–1930 the works produced 11 passenger planes Fokker F-VIIb/3m on Fokker licence, and 20 of own Fokker F-VIIb/3m bomber modification.

Own designs 
In the mid-1920s the factory management was changed, and the main designer became Jerzy Rudlicki. Then, apart from licence production, the works started to produce own aircraft, under Lublin name, designated "R" for Rudlicki.

The first own design was a biplane bomber Lublin R-VIII, flown in 1928. Six were produced by 1930, three of them were later converted to seaplanes and used in the Polish naval aviation until 1939. Prototype light passenger planes: biplane R-IX, and high-wing R-XI were not ordered by the Polish Airlines. Also sport high-wing plane Lublin R-XII was not produced in series.

Another design was a parasol wing liaison aircraft Lublin R-X, flown in 1929. It won a contest for a Polish Air Force liaison plane, but only 7 were produced. Instead, Rudlicki developed it further and designed trainer aircraft R-XIV and an army cooperation plane Lublin R-XIII, which became Polish main army cooperation plane (and the only mass-produced Lublin). 15 of R-XIV were built in 1930–31, and 223 of R-XIII were built in 1932–1935 (further 50 after nationalization). Its experimental variant R-XIX introduced the V-tail, invented by Rudlicki.

The light passenger plane Lublin R-XVI of 1932 was not ordered by the airlines, but 6 were produced as air ambulance R-XVIb. The last construction was a two-engine torpedo seaplane Lublin R-XX, flown in 1935, but it was not produced as well. Apart from these, some other designs did not reach prototype stage.

In 1924–1933 the works produced also car bodies, mainly for Somua (imported) and Ursus buses, but also for luxury imported cars and the Ralf-Stetysz cars.

Due to plans of Polish aviation authorities (mainly Ludomił Rayski) to gather all aviation industry in state-owned factories, Plage & Laśkiewicz works were forced to bankruptcy. After delivering 7 of ordered 50 R-XIIIF aircraft in late 1935, the Polish Ministry of War broke the contract under a pretext. As a result, the factory went bankrupt and then was  nationalized under the name LWS (Lubelska Wytwórnia Samolotów – Lublin Aircraft Works). Then, 18 almost ready R-XIIIF, bought by scrap price, were completed, and the next series of 32 was built.

Aircraft

References

Notes

Bibliography

Andrzej Glass: "Polskie konstrukcje lotnicze 1893–1939" (Polish aviation constructions 1893–1939), WKiŁ, Warsaw 1977  (no ISBN)

Aircraft manufacturers of Poland